Doni Grdić (born 22 January 2002) is a Croatian-Australian footballer, who currently plays for BSK Bijelo Brdo on loan from Šibenik.

Club career
Grdić started his career with Croatian top flight side Šibenik.

International career
Grdić has played for the Australia national U-17 and U-20 teams through his father, former Australian soccer player Anthony Grdic. He remains available to represent for the senior team of either Croatia or Australia.

In May 2021, he was called to the Olyroos by manager Graham Arnold in a string of friendlies preparing for the 2020 Summer Olympics, but was unused in all three friendlies as Australia were edged both by Ireland, Romania and Mexico. He was not included into the final squad of the Olyroos.

References

External links
 Doni Grdić at Soccerway

2002 births
Living people
Sportspeople from Šibenik
Australian people of Croatian descent
Association football central defenders
Croatian footballers
Australian soccer players
Australia under-20 international soccer players
HNK Šibenik players
NK BSK Bijelo Brdo players
Croatian Football League players
Australian expatriate soccer players